Moluk Bazar (also Romanized as Molūk Bāzār; also known as Molūg Bāzār) is a village in Polan Rural District, Polan District, Chabahar County, Sistan and Baluchestan Province, Iran. At the 2006 census, its population was 130, in 15 families.

References 

Populated places in Chabahar County